Amelia Bloomer House is a historic home located at Seneca Falls in Seneca County, New York.

Description and history 
It is a two-story, Italianate style frame dwelling built originally in 1830 and modified to its present style in the 1850s. In 1945, the house was modified to be a multiple dwelling. The home is notable as the residence of temperance advocate and women's rights leader Amelia Bloomer. It is also reputed to have been a stop on the Underground Railroad.

It was listed on the National Register of Historic Places on August 29, 1980.

References

Houses on the National Register of Historic Places in New York (state)
History of women's rights in the United States
Houses in Seneca County, New York
Houses on the Underground Railroad
National Register of Historic Places in Seneca County, New York
Seneca Falls, New York
Italianate architecture in New York (state)
History of women in New York (state)